We as Human is the first major label and second and final studio album by Christian rock band We as Human, released on June 25, 2013 by Atlantic Records. The album was produced by Howard Benson.

Critical reception

We as Human has received positive reception from music critics. Matt Collar at Allmusic noted that "this is hard-hitting, but also uplifting, spiritually inclined rock that straddles the line between radio-ready melodicism and in-your-face guitar power." At CCM Magazine, Matt Conner wrote that "few debut albums can boast the sort of company collected on We As Human's self-titled LP", and he proclaimed that "We As Human are a great rock band on their own." Christian Music Zine's Micah Garnett told that "it's an album that deserves to be set on repeat and played at full volume", and that "if you're a rock fan, We As Human will tickle your ears and keep you satisfied for a long time." In addition, Garnett felt that "We As Human's self-titled album is not only one of the best debuts [he's] heard, it's one of the best albums [he's] ever heard." At Jesus Freak Hideout, Mark Rice said that "with this album, We As Human has firmly placed themselves into the 'solid-but-unspectacular' category", and evoked that "there is otherwise nothing new here. It is certainly a worthy debut, but just don't expect anything spectacular." Mary Nikkel of New Release Tuesday felt that on the album "We As Human steps up to own their identity with a confidence and intensity rarely found even in long-established bands", and that the "release is a perfect storm of searing riffs, dynamic vocals, and aggression channeled into lyrics fueling the struggle of death to self and rebirth to life." At Christian Music Review, Daniel Edgeman told that he "felt the album was produced very well with just the right amount of mellow songs, digital sound effects, and heavy sound." At Melodic.net, Johan Wippsson noted how the release has "a great collection of rock anthem, made for the arenas, but with a slightly heavier appearance", and felt that the album was "really good from start to end."

At HM, Sarah Brehm highlighted that "this 10-track album is good at what it does – aggressive, heavy rock layered with trilling and gritty guitars, pounding drums and energetic vocals – yet as a whole, it feels a little generic." Furthermore, Brehm felt that "despite its overarching generic feel, We As Human will sell well and make a dent in the Christian rock genre", and that the listeners should "Watch out for this band; as it grows in musicianship and creativity, the next album has the potential to blow everyone away." Lee Brown of Indie Vision Music felt that "something is still waiting", "something was just missing", and "the production quality (while clean) really hindered this release", which he called "just pretty good." Jesus Freak Hideout's Timothy Estabrooks affirmed that "We As Human is by no means a bad album, and it might even be a 'good' album, but that's it. There's too much re-treading of old ground, too much adherence to tired cliches, and not enough boldness in songwriting to really call this album anything other than average."

Track listing

Personnel

We As Human
 Justin Cordle — vocals
 Jake Jones — rhythm guitar, background vocals
 Justin Forshaw — lead guitar
 Dave Draggoo — bass, background vocals
 Adam Osborne — drums

Production
 Howard Benson - producer
 Chris Lord-Alge - mixing
 Ted Jensen - mastering

Charts

References

2013 albums
Atlantic Records albums
Albums produced by Howard Benson